Miguel Bayot (10 July 1644 – 28 August 1700) was a Roman Catholic prelate who served as the Bishop of Cebu (1697–1700).

Biography
Miguel Bayot was born in Belmonte, Spain and ordained in the Franciscan Order. On 13 May 1697 Pope Alexander VIII appointed him Bishop of Cebu. On 21 September 1699 he was consecrated bishop by Diego Camacho y Ávila, Archbishop of Manila assisted by Father Domingo de Valencia. He served as Bishop of Cebu until his death on 28 August 1700.

See also 
Catholic Church in the Philippines

References

External links and additional sources
 (for Chronology of Bishops) 
 (for Chronology of Bishops) 

1644 births
1700 deaths
Bishops appointed by Pope Alexander VIII
Roman Catholic bishops of Cebu